Lithurgopsis is a genus of northern cactus woodborers in the family Megachilidae. There are at least nine described species in Lithurgopsis.

Species
These species belong to the genus Lithurgopsis.
 Lithurgopsis antilleorum (Michener, 1988)
 Lithurgopsis apicalis (Cresson, 1875)
 Lithurgopsis bitorulosa (Snelling, 1986)
 Lithurgopsis echinocacti (Cockerell, 1898)
 Lithurgopsis gibbosa (Smith, 1853)
 Lithurgopsis listrota (Snelling, 1983)
 Lithurgopsis littoralis (Cockerell, 1917)
 Lithurgopsis planifrons (Friese, 1908)
 Lithurgopsis rufiventris (Friese, 1908)

References

 Hinojosa-Díaz I (2008). "The giant resin bee making its way west: First record in Kansas (Hymenoptera: Megachilidae)". ZooKeys 1: 67–71.

Further reading

 

Megachilidae